is a Japanese sculptor.

Funakoshi is considered a leading name in the field of visual arts in his country. His father, Yasutake Funakoshi, was also a sculptor and soon he felt the same vocation. He studied in the University of Art and Design, from 1971 to 1975, and in the University of Fine Arts and Music, from 1975 to 1977. He started carving in camphor wood in 1980. His works, usually depicting human figures from the waist up, have a great poetical effect, and are striking and distinctive. Funakoshi's works this material in a personal way and leaves visible both the grain of the wood and the marks of carving. The artist carefully utilises the grain for modelling and leaves part of the head unpainted, normally the crown. 

He has exhibited his work at the Venice Biennale, the São Paulo Biennale, the Documenta IX, and the Shanghai Biennale, and his work is represented in several art museums in Japan and other countries.

References

1951 births
20th-century Japanese sculptors
21st-century Japanese sculptors
Japanese contemporary artists
Living people
People from Morioka, Iwate